Samsun Province is a province of Turkey on the Black Sea coast with a population of 1,252,693 (2010). Its adjacent provinces are Sinop on the northwest, Çorum on the west, Amasya on the south, Tokat on the southeast on the east. Its traffic code is 55.

The provincial capital is Samsun, one of the most populated cities in Turkey.

History
Surgical instruments are manufactured in the province today and were 4000 years ago. The founder of the Turkish Republic,  Mustafa Kemal Atatürk, started the Turkish War of Independence here on May 19, 1919.

Geography

Lakes
Ladik Lake, Akgöl, Dumanlı lake, Semenlik lake.

Rivers
Kızılırmak, Yeşilırmak, Terme river, Aptal Suyu, Mert Irmağı, Kürtün Suyu.

Forest 
There are also small areas of bottomland forest.

Districts 

Samsun province is divided into 17 districts, four of which are included in the municipality of Samsun city (shown in boldface letters).
 İlkadım
 Canik
 Atakum
 Tekkeköy
Alaçam
Asarcık
Ayvacık
Bafra
Çarşamba
Havza
Kavak
Ladik
Ondokuzmayıs
Salıpazarı
Terme
Vezirköprü
Yakakent

References

External links

 Samsun governor's official website 
 Samsun municipality's official website 
 Pictures of the capital of Samsun province
 Oymaağaç archaeology